Mottaya Kudumban was an Indian politician and former Member of the Legislative Assembly of Tamil Nadu. He was elected to the Tamil Nadu legislative assembly as a Marxist Forward Bloc candidate from Mudukulathur constituency in  1952 election. He was one of the two winners from the same constituency in that election, the other being U. Muthuramalinga Thevar.

References

Tamil Nadu politicians